The Marquette West River is a tributary of the Marquette River, flowing into the unorganized territory of Lac-Ashuapmushuan, Quebec, in the Regional County Municipality (RCM) of Le Domaine-du-Roy, in the administrative region of Saguenay-Lac-Saint-Jean, in Quebec, in Canada.

The Marquette West River flows successively into the townships of Huard, Buade, Poutrincourt and Cramahé. The course of this river is located west of the Ashuapmushuan Wildlife Reserve. Forestry is the main economic activity of this valley; recreational tourism activities, second.

The forest road R0212 (East-West direction) intersects the middle section of the Marquette River West. The route 167 linking Chibougamau to Saint-Félicien, Quebec passes on the north-east side of the Normandin River and on the Northeast of Ashuapmushuan Lake.

The surface of the Marquette West River is usually frozen from early November to mid-May, however, safe ice movement is generally from mid-November to mid-April.

Geography

Toponymy 
This hydronym evokes the work of life of Jacques Marquette (Laon, France, 1637 - near Luddington, Michigan, 1675). He was a Jesuit missionary and explorer. He first studied Amerindian languages, then he devoted himself to various missions including the Outaouais; in 1671, he founded the mission of Saint-Ignace, among the Wendat (Hurons), on the north shore of Michilimakinac Strait. In 1672, he met Louis Jolliet with whom he would reach the Mississippi River. He will explore this river to the present border of Arkansas and Louisiana. Wanting to start a mission with the Kaskaskias in the land of Illinois, Father Marquette reluctantly relinquishes it because of illness.

The toponym "Rivière Marquette Ouest" was formalized on March 28, 1972, at the Commission de toponymie du Québec.

Notes and references

See also 

Rivers of Saguenay–Lac-Saint-Jean
Le Domaine-du-Roy Regional County Municipality